Seyed Mohammad Ehsan Hosseini (Persian:  سید محمد احسان حسینی born October 3, 1998)  is an Iranian  footballer who plays as a defender for Persepolis in the Persian Gulf Pro League.

Club career

Persepolis F.C.
Hosseini joined Persepolis in summer 2017 with a contract until 2020.

Career statistics

Honours
Persepolis
Persian Gulf Pro League (3): 2017–18, 2018–19, 2019–20
Iranian Super Cup (2): 2018, 2019
Hazfi Cup (1): 2018–19
AFC Champions League runner-up: 2018, 2020

References 

 https://www.varzesh3.com/news/1424676/%D8%A7%D8%AD%D8%B3%D8%A7%D9%86-%D8%AD%D8%B3%DB%8C%D9%86%DB%8C-%D8%A8%D9%87-%D9%BE%D8%B1%D8%B3%D9%BE%D9%88%D9%84%DB%8C%D8%B3-%D9%BE%DB%8C%D9%88%D8%B3%D8%AA احسان حسینی به پرسپولیس  پیوست 
 https://www.beytoote.com/sport/athletic/biography-ehsan1-hosseini.html?m=1 بیوگرافی احسان حسینی
 Iran - E. Hosseini - Profile with news, career statistics and history - Soccerway". int.soccerway.com int.soccerway.com.

External links 

 Ehsan Hosseini at Iranleague 
 Ehsan Hosseini at Soccerway
 Ehsan Hosseini at Instagram

1998 births
Living people
Iranian footballers
Sportspeople from Tehran
Persepolis F.C. players
Association football forwards